Eterna Inocencia (Everlasting Innocence) is an Argentine rock band with politically motivated lyrics and opinions. Their origin dates to 1995, in the city of Quilmes, Buenos Aires Province. They come from the hardcore punk trend of the mid-1990s. They form part of their own independent label, called Discos Del Sembrador.

Members
Current members
Guillermo Mármol - lead vocals
Roy Ota - lead guitar, backing vocals
Alejandro Navajas - bass
Javier Pesquero - rhythm guitar
Germán Rodriguez - drums

Former members
Joan Sprei - drums 
Pablo Wilk - drums
Tatán - bass

Discography
 Studio albums
 Punkypatin (1995; La Unión)
 Días Tristes (1997; La Unión, Sniffing, W.C.)	
 Recycle (1999; Sniffing)
 A Los Que Se Han Apagado (2001; Discos Del Sembrador)
 Las Palabras y los Ríos (2004; Discos Del Sembrador)
 La Resistencia (2006; Discos Del Sembrador)
 Ei (2009; Discos Del Sembrador)
 Entre Llanos y Antigales (2014; Discos Del Sembrador)
 No Bien Abran Las Flores (2022; Discos Del Sembrador)

 Live albums
 Vivo Rock N Pop (2002; Discos Del Sembrador)  
 Una Tarde Mágica CD/DVD (2004; Discos Del Sembrador, Activate)
 En Vivo 31/10/2009 (2011; Discos Del Sembrador) 
 08/11/15 Club Tucuman de Quilmes (2015; Discos Del Sembrador) 
 Verano Permanente DVD (2018; Discos Del Sembrador) 

 EPs
 Tómalo con Calma (2003; Lee-Chi)
 Cañaveral (2005; Discos Del Sembrador) 

 Singles
 "Cosas por Hacer / Danilo" (2021; Discos Del Sembrador)
 "Despedida / Laguna Larga" (2021; Discos Del Sembrador)

 Splits
 Juggling Jugulars / Divide And Conquer / Lee Majors / Eterna Inocencia (1997; Sanjam)
 Un Split Amigo 7" with Wisper (1997; Sniffing)
 Boda / Eterna Inocencia (2000; Sanjam, Shark Attack, Les Nains Aussi)

 Compilation albums
 Lados B (2002; Discos Del Sembrador) 
 Backflip/Un Salto Mortal Para Atrás (2002; Chumpire)

References

Argentine alternative rock groups
Argentine hardcore punk groups